Danilo D'Ambrosio (born 9 September 1988) is an Italian professional footballer who plays as a centre-back or as a right-back for  club Inter Milan and the Italy national team.

Club career

Early career
Born in Naples, D'Ambrosio began playing for local Campania side Salernitana. However, the club went bankrupt and he, along with his brother Dario, joined the Fiorentina youth team in 2005. He was part of the Fiorentina primavera until December 2007, but on 8 January 2008 he was sold to Serie C1 side Potenza on a co-ownership agreement. He made his professional debut on 20 January 2008 in a 2–1 victory over Juve Stabia, ultimately making ten appearances during the season. In June 2008, Fiorentina repurchased D'Ambrosio.

Juve Stabia
On 11 July 2008, D'Ambrosio joined Lega Pro Prima Divisione side Juve Stabia in another co-ownership deal, for €30,000, making his debut for Le vespe on 31 August 2008 against Taranto.

D'Ambrosio became a starter for Juve Stabia in his first season, who decided to purchase his remaining contract from Fiorentina for another €75,500. He spent the next season mostly playing as a right midfielder, even scoring his first goal in a home victory against Barletta, 4–1.

Torino
On 12 January 2010, D'Ambrosio was signed by Torino in a co-ownership agreement for a €200,000 transfer fee. He made his Serie B debut on 16 January 2010 in a 4–1 home win against Grosseto. He was a regular for Torino during the season, scoring his first goal for the granata on 20 March 2010 in a 2–0 away win against Modena. Torino purchased the remaining half of his contract from Juve Stabia in June 2010 for an additional €500,000.

During the following season, D'Ambrosio was also a starter for new coach Franco Lerda. He scored the first brace of his career in a 3–2 home win against Modena, one of the only two goals of his season. On 15 December 2010, he renewed his contract with Torino until 2014. However, his season was characterised by negative performances and Torino's failure to reach the playoffs made him the object of much criticism.

New head coach Giampiero Ventura decided to focus on D'Ambrosio for the 2011–12 season, playing him as right back with Matteo Darmian. On 2 November 2011, he scored the winning goal against Reggina. He repeated this on 11 February 2012, scoring in a 3–1 win over Nocerina. Throughout the season, D'Ambrosio contributed 26 appearances and 3 goals with Torino being promoted.

D'Ambrosio made his Serie A debut on 26 August 2012 during the goalless draw against Siena, appearing as a 93rd-minute-substitute, but did not start until 26 September against Udinese (0–0). He scored his first goal in Serie A during a 5–1 win away against Atalanta. In December 2012, he became Torino's vice-captain after Angelo Ogbonna suffered an injury. He was voted Torino's revelation of the year by the readers of Toro.it.

D'Ambrosio covered as a left back in the 2013–14 season, scoring in the 2–2 home draw against Milan on 14 September 2013. He scored again the following week away against Bologna, in a game won 2–1 by Torino. On 13 December 2013, Torino chairman Urbano Cairo confirmed that D'Ambrosio would be leaving the club after turning down a contract extension. The former vice-captain concluded his experience at Torino with 119 appearances and 10 goals.

Inter Milan

2013–14 season
On 8 January 2014, Tuttosport reported that D'Ambrosio would join Inter in a cash plus player deal. On 28 January, Tuttosport revealed that the fee was €1.75 million cash plus the free loan of Matteo Colombi and 50% of the registration rights of Marco Benassi. (Although the transfer also cost Inter an additional €1.04M on agent and other misc. fee on top of the value of the 50% rights of Benassi (€1M) and cash paid (€1.75M)) Two days later, Inter confirmed the deal.

Three days after that, he made his debut for Nerazzurri in the Derby d'Italia against Juventus at Juventus Stadium, a 3–1 Inter loss. On 15 March, D'Ambrosio started his first match with Inter, defeating Hellas Verona 2–0 at the Stadio Marc'Antonio Bentegodi. Following that result, he secured a place in the starting lineup. D'Ambrosio was an unused substitute in Javier Zanetti's last competitive match at the San Siro, in which Inter defeated Lazio 4–1 to secure a place in UEFA Europa League play-off for next season. D'Ambrosio finished his first season with Inter having played 11 matches, 3 of which he played in their entirety.

2014–15 season
D'Ambrosio scored his first competitive goal for Inter on his European debut, a 3–0 away win over Stjarnan in the first leg of Europa League play-off. With a 6–0 victory in the second leg, Inter advanced to the group stage 9–0 on aggregate.

On 18 September, in the first Europa League group match against Ukrainian side Dnipro Dnipropetrovsk, he scored the only goal of the match. D'Ambrosio described his goal as "the most important of his career". He scored again in the second group match on 2 October, opening a 2–0 home victory over Azerbaijani side Qarabağ.

D'Ambrosio concluded his first full-season with Inter Milan by making 32 appearances in all competitions, scoring three times, all in Europa League.

2015–16 season
On 20 February 2016, D'Ambrosio scored his first league goal for Inter during the 3–1 home win over Sampdoria, beating the goalkeeper with a volley in with the inside of his left boot at the back post. That was the first "Italian" goal for Inter in Serie A since Andrea Ranocchia scored on 15 December 2014. Eight days later, against Juventus for the next league match, D'Ambrosio's misplaced a header resulting in Leonardo Bonucci scoring in 47th minute; the match finished 2–0 for Juventus. Later, on 12 March against Bologna, he was again in the scoresheet for the second time this season, scoring the second goal of the match minutes before assisting the goal of Ivan Perišić, helping Inter to get its second consecutive league win.

2016–17 season
D'Ambrosio won more playing time under head coaches Frank de Boer and Stefano Pioli, starting all the match except in October, as he was the second outfield player with most balls recovered. He scored his first strike of the season against Pescara on 28 January 2017, netting the opener in an eventual 3–0 home win. On 19 February, he set up the lone goal at Bologna scored by Gabriel Barbosa. Later, on 7 April, D'Ambrosio agreed to a contract extension, signing until 2021. Two days later, he scored against Crotone but in a 2–1 losing effort, equaling his personal best, set in 2011–12 season.

2017–18 season
D'Ambrosio played his 100th Serie A match for Inter on 25 November 2017 in the 3–1 away win versus Cagliari in matchday 14. In the final matchday of the season, his goal in the 29th minute versus Lazio served as a temporary equalizer in an eventual 3–2 win at Stadio Olimpico which meant the return of Inter in UEFA Champions League after six years.

2018–19 season
On 25 September 2018, D'Ambrosio scored his first goal of the season in a league match against Fiorentina following a combination with Mauro Icardi to give Inter the 2–1 win at San Siro, the first home win in league for the 2018–19 season.

International career
On 11 August 2010, D'Ambrosio made his debut with the Italy under-21 national team in a friendly match against Denmark.

On 28 March 2017, D'Ambrosio made his senior international debut for Italy alongside four other debutants, appearing as a substitute in a 2–1 friendly away win against the Netherlands.

He made his first start for Italy under Roberto Mancini, in a 3–1 friendly loss to France in Nice on 1 June 2018.

Style of play
D'Ambrosio is a quick, energetic, offensive fullback, who is physically strong, good in the air, and who also possesses good stamina, timing, and reliable technical ability. He primarily plays on the right, but is also capable of playing on the left, due to his tactical versatility as a defender, and is known for his ability to cut into the centre from this position onto his stronger right foot and attempt a shot, due to his eye for goal. He has also been used as a wing-back or wide midfielder in a 3–5–2 formation, and has even been deployed as a central midfielder, or as a centre-back on occasion.

Personal life
D'Ambrosio has an identical twin brother Dario, who also plays as a defender, for Monza. Both grew up in Caivano in a football school, Sporting Caivano 94.

In April 2014, D'Ambrosio joined Twitter and with his first post claimed that for every follower he received, he would make a donation of €0.50 to the "Aiutare I Bambini" charity which gives aid to needy children in his home region of Campania. He eventually donated €11,500.

Career statistics

Club

International

Honours
Torino
Serie B runner-up: 2011–12

Inter Milan
Serie A: 2020–21
 Coppa Italia: 2021–22
 Supercoppa Italiana: 2021, 2022
UEFA Europa League runner-up: 2019–20

Individual
Torino's Revelation of the Year: 2012–13

References

External links

 Profile at the Inter Milan website
 Profile at AIC.Football.it 
 Profile at UEFA.com 
 Profile at FIGC.it  

1988 births
Living people
Italian twins
Footballers from Naples
Twin sportspeople
Italian footballers
Italy youth international footballers
Italy under-21 international footballers
Italy international footballers
Association football defenders
U.S. Salernitana 1919 players
ACF Fiorentina players
Potenza S.C. players
S.S. Juve Stabia players
Torino F.C. players
Inter Milan players
Serie B players
Serie A players